Swami Tejomayananda Saraswati (born 30 June 1950), also known as Guruji and  born Sudhakar Kaitwade, is an Indian spiritual leader. He was head of Chinmaya Mission from 1994 to 2017, until he was succeeded by Swami Swaroopananda in 2017.

Initiation and disciplehood
After attending couple of talks of Swami Chinmayananda on Bhagavad Gita, Sudhakar Kaitwade was inspired to join Chinmaya Mission's residential Vedanta course at Sandeepany Sadhanalaya in Mumbai.  Upon completing the course in 1975, he was initiated as Brahmachari Vivek Chaitanya and also studied under Swami Dayananda Saraswati (Arsha Vidya) who was conducting the long-term resident course.

On 21 October 1983, Swami Chinmayananda initiated him into sannyasa, bestowing upon him the name Swami Tejomayananda.

The missionary
As the Head of Chinmaya Mission Worldwide, Swami Tejomayananda – known in the Mission as Pujya Guruji – has been involved in several projects, including the Chinmaya International Residential School in Coimbatore, the Chinmaya Centre of World Understanding in New Delhi, the Chinmaya International Foundation near Cochin, the Chinmaya Heritage Centre in Chennai, the expansion of the Chinmaya Mission Hospital in Bangalore and the Chinmaya Vibhooti Vision Centre near Pune.

He has travelled internationally extensively. Throughout his travels, he conducts jnana yajnas (3-7 day Vedanta lecture series) in different cities and various countries every week.

Roles
Swami Tejomayananda has served several roles in Chinmaya Mission, including
 Acharya of the Sandeepany Sadhanalaya ashram in Mumbai, India
 Acharya of Chinmaya Mission's center at San Jose, California, USA
 Head of Chinmaya Mission worldwide

Awards

 Swami Tejomayananda was awarded the Padma Bhushan, the third highest civilian award in the Republic of India, in 2016.

Works
Swami Tejomayananda has published more than 100 books on Vedanta.

References

External links
 Swami Tejomayananda's Itinerary
 Chinmaya International Foundation Trustees

1950 births
Living people
Indian Hindu monks
Vedanta
Advaitin philosophers
20th-century Hindu philosophers and theologians
Marathi people
Indian spiritual writers
Recipients of the Padma Bhushan in other fields